Adeloneivaia acuta is a moth of the  family Saturniidae. It is found from Venezuela to Paraguay and in the south-east of Brazil, but not in the Amazon.

External links
Species info

Ceratocampinae
Moths described in 1896
Moths of South America